Cradle of History is an IDM/techno album by Johnny Hawk (Johnathon Taylor) under the recording name of Global Goon.  It is his second full album and third release on Rephlex Records.  It was released in 1998.

Track listing 
 "Sloe Intro"  – 5:10
 "Funkydrunk"  – 4:45
 "Jazz Intro"  – 4:00
 "Long Whiney"  – 3:54
 "Dum Dar Dee"  – 4:53
 "Quirkytill"  – 1:52
 "Duck Soup"  – 2:14
 "Dx"  – 4:48
 "Afterlife"  – 4:28
 "Grand Piano"  – 5:21
 "Prince"  – 4:59
 "Snare Rush"  – 3:50
 "Mim"  – 3:32
 "Rockford"  – 4:03
 "Vocal Loop"  – 1:03
 "Bassy Hip Hop"  – 4:30
 "Ready to Roll"  – 1:40
 "Hardcore Symphony"  – 2:25
 "Open Hyhatt"  – 3:49
 "Gallery"  – 5:27

Personnel 

Global Goon – Arranger, Composer, Producer, Performer

References 

1998 albums
Rephlex Records albums
Global Goon albums